Streptomyces nogalater is a bacterium species from the genus of Streptomyces. Streptomyces nogalater produces nogalamycin.

Further reading

See also 
 List of Streptomyces species

References

External links
Type strain of Streptomyces nogalater at BacDive -  the Bacterial Diversity Metadatabase

nogalater
Bacteria described in 1966